Half Mentlu is a 2016 Indian Kannada-language romantic drama directed by Lakshmi Dinesh and starring newcomer Sandeepa and Sonu Gowda. The plot is based on an incident that happened in Ramanagara in 2010 and the characters are based on real life people. The film had a delayed release in 2016 after being stuck in the cans since 2013.

Cast
Sandeepa as Shiva a.k.a. Shivu
Sonu Gowda as Madhu
Achyuth Kumar
Tabla Nani
 Mico Nagaraj
 Lakshmi Devamma
 Srinivas Gowda 
 Mohan Juneja

Production
Assistant director Sandeepa, who played a small role in Googly (2013), gave up his government job to play the lead role in this film. Sandeepa was not to play the lead role but the director liked his mannerisms and chose him. The film was shot near Nandini Layout. Shooting was completed in 2013.

Soundtrack
Music by Bharath BJ. The song "Jeeva Haani Aagomunna" is not a part of the soundtrack album.

Release and reception
The release of the film was delayed after the  Censor Board's refusal to give films CBFC certificates. The producer of the film attempted suicide after he was unable to release the film.

Archana Nathan of The Hindu opined that "Half Mentalu, with its half-baked plot and misunderstood idea of love drives you mad, for sure". Sunayana Suresh of The Times of India criticised Sandeepa's dialogue delivery but wrote that "The biggest highlight of the film are Bharath BJ's tunes. These come as much-needed respite between the confused narrative". G. S. Kumar of Filmfare gave a similar review and criticised Sandeepa's acting and stated that "The only good part in this movie is its music, composed by B J Bharath". Shashiprasad S. M. of Deccan Chronicle wrote that "there could not have been a more appropriate name for a film that highlights its shoddy making and the sad plight of the unknowing audience who watched a bit too much of it".

References

Notes